Maurizio Pozzi (born 25 June 1970) is an Italian cross-country skier who competed between 1992 and 2008. His best World Cup finish was third in a 30 km event in Russia in 1997.

Pozzi also finished ninth in the 50 km event at the 1998 Winter Olympics in Nagano, Japan. He is member of the Gruppo Sportivo Forestale.

Cross-country skiing results
All results are sourced from the International Ski Federation (FIS).

Olympic Games

World Championships

World Cup

Season standings

Individual podiums
1 podium

Team podiums
 2 victories – (1 , 1 ) 
 4 podiums – (3 , 1 )

References

External links

1970 births
Cross-country skiers at the 1998 Winter Olympics
Italian male cross-country skiers
Living people
Olympic cross-country skiers of Italy